Out of Frequency is the second album by Danish band The Asteroids Galaxy Tour. It was released on 31 January 2012 by BMG Rights.

Track listing

Charts

Release history

Notes

2012 albums
The Asteroids Galaxy Tour albums